On 15 January 2000 Côte d'Ivoire has expanded its national numbering plan from 6 to 8 digits. Two digits were prepended to existing subscriber numbers, according to the former numbering range, type of service and carrier.

Calling formats
To call in Ivory Coast, the following format is used:
 yy xx xx xx xx - calls within Ivory Coast
 +225 27 xx xx xx xx calls from outside Ivory Coast to a landline
 +225 01 xx xx xx xx / +225 05 xx xx xx xx  / +225 07 xx xx xx xx  /  +225 25 xx xx xx xx  calls from outside Ivory Coast to a mobile number

List of area codes in the Ivory Coast

For fixed lines, the third digit of the NSN signifies the network operator.

References

National Numbering Plan (NNP) of Côte d’Ivoire - accessed 11 August 2011.

Ivory Coast
Telecommunications in Ivory Coast
Telephone numbers